Graham Edward Thomas (1 February 1931 – 1998) was an Australian middle-distance runner. He competed in the men's 3000 metres steeplechase at the 1956 Summer Olympics.

References

1931 births
1998 deaths
Athletes (track and field) at the 1956 Summer Olympics
Australian male middle-distance runners
Australian male steeplechase runners
Olympic athletes of Australia
Place of birth missing